The Memorial Church of Harvard University is a building on the campus of Harvard University. It is an inter-denominational Protestant church.

History

Predecessors
The first distinct building for worship at Harvard University was Holden Chapel, built in 1744. The college soon outgrew the building, which was replaced by a chapel inside Harvard Hall in 1766, then a chapel in University Hall in 1814, and finally by Appleton Chapel, a building dedicated solely to worship sited where Memorial Church now stands.

Standing for 73 years before the current building, Appleton Chapel was home to religious life at Harvard until 1932. Its namesake is preserved inside Memorial Church, as the Appleton Chapel portion of the main building houses the daily service of Morning Prayer.  When Appleton Chapel was built in 1858 thanks to the generosity of Samuel Appleton, Morning Prayer attendance was compulsory. When attendance became voluntary in 1886, the college was left with a building that had become too large for the Morning Prayer services and too small for the Sunday services. Although there was talk of building a more suitable chapel for worship at Harvard, nothing was done until soon after World War I when Harvard University President Abbott Lawrence Lowell (1909–1933) combined the idea of a war memorial with the need for a new chapel. Appleton Chapel was torn down after the 1931 Commencement. The University Architects Coolidge, Shepley, Bulfinch & Abbott, were enlisted to design the new building, and they planned a structure that would complement the imposing edifice of Widener Library. This created an open area known as the Tercentenary Theatre, where Commencement Exercises are held.

Memorial Church
The current Memorial Church was built in 1932 in honor of the men and women of Harvard University who died in World War I. The names of 373 alumni were engraved within alongside a sculpture named The Sacrifice by Malvina Hoffman. It was dedicated on Armistice Day on November 11, 1932.  The knight's face in The Sacrifice was modelled on the British World War I flying ace, Ian Henderson.

Since then, other memorials have been established within the building commemorating those Harvardians who later died in World War II, the Korean War, and the Vietnam War.  For seventy-five years, it has stood in Harvard Yard opposite Widener Library as a physical reminder of Harvard's spiritual heritage. Since its inception, the Harvard Memorial Church has had weekly choral music provided at its Sunday services by the Harvard University Choir, which is composed of both graduate and undergraduate students in the university.

Gallery

References

External links

The Memorial Church – Home Page

Harvard University buildings
University and college chapels in the United States
1932 establishments in Massachusetts
Churches in Cambridge, Massachusetts
Harvard Square